"Paris, Tokyo" is a Grammy-nominated third single from Lupe Fiasco's second studio album Lupe Fiasco's The Cool. It was first presented at the 2007 Lollapalooza in Chicago. The single was officially serviced to radio stations as of April 3, 2008 according to Lupe Fiasco's MySpace blog. The official digital release of the song was on April 12, 2008. It contains a sample of Eumir Deodato's "San Juan Sunset".

The video made its TV premiere when MTV Jams made it the Jam of the Week on June 23, 2008. It also debuted on BET's 106 & Park on July 8, 2008 as the new joint of the day.

The official remix features Pharrell Williams, Q-Tip and fellow record label artist Sarah Green, the song was released September 22, 2008.

Background
Speaking in March 2008 to noted UK urban writer Pete Lewis - Deputy Editor of the award-winning Blues & Soul - Fiasco explained the inspiration behind the song: "I love Paris, I love Tokyo... And what inspired me to write the song was that between 'Food And Liquor' and this album we travelled EVERYWHERE - multiple countries, multiple towns, multiple tours. So I just developed a knack and a love for touring, even if I didn't want to do it! You know, despite the lyrical wear and tear it has on your body - particularly with the different climates - just by force I had to fall in love with it! And of course another side to it all is, when you travel, you leave people behind. So I actually wrote the song for my girl. Because I'd be gone so much we'd go for two months at a time without seeing each other. So it's basically her song. Just to let her know that, wherever I go, she comes with me - even if it is just mentally or in spirit."

Music video
The video (directed by Erik White) was released onto Lupe Fiasco's official YouTube channel at midnight on April 13, 2008.

Chart positions

References

External links
 

2008 singles
Lupe Fiasco songs
Songs written by Lupe Fiasco
Music videos directed by Erik White
2008 songs
Atlantic Records singles